DutchCaribbeanExel was an airline with its head office in Amsterdam. The airline connected from the Netherlands to the Netherlands Antilles and was based at Amsterdam Airport Schiphol.

History
The airline was established in 2004 and started operations on July 15, 2004. It was wholly owned by ExelAviation Group. The airline folded in early February 2005 when the group declared bankruptcy.

The ExelAviation Group started to disintegrate late-2004, soon after the takeover of DutchBird; when failed Air Holland (declared bankrupt with €30M in debt) was investigated for alleged laundering of drug money and arrests were made, it put HollandExel in negative publicity as well.

In February 2005, HollandExel filed for the Dutch equivalent of Chapter 11 and its main client, tour operator TUI Netherlands invested millions to keep the airline flying. Two months later, TUI Netherlands continued HollandExel under new management, operating as ArkeFly and the fleet of aircraft plus some 400 employees moved to the new company.

DutchCaribbeanExel would later, together with its sister airline, HollandExel, be taken over by TUI AG and renamed it as Arkefly Curaçao.

Destinations

DutchCaribbeanExel operated the following services (in January 2005):

Fleet
The DutchCaribbeanExel fleet consisted of the following aircraft (at April 2005):

See also
HollandExel
List of defunct airlines of the Netherlands

References

External links

DutchCaribbeanExel (Archive)
DutchCaribbeanExel Fleet Detail
Bankruptcy Information

Defunct airlines of the Netherlands
Airlines established in 2004
Airlines disestablished in 2005
ExelAviation